Edward Renouf may refer to:
 Edward Renouf (chemist)
 Edward Renouf (artist)